Paul Otieno Imbaya (26 September 1973 – 25 December 2007), better known for his stage name Mighty King Kong, was a reggae musician from Kenya. He was born in Ugenya, Siaya District.

As a child he suffered severe polio attack and was disabled from the waist down. He went to Ambira Primary School, but dropped out at Standard Six following the death of his father. He moved to Kisumu city where he became a street kid and beggar.

In 1993 he moved to Nairobi. With the assistance of DJ Stone, a local deejay whom he had met in Kisumu, he was able to perform at Nairobi clubs on a weekly basis.

Few years later he moved to Mombasa and performed with bands like Them Mushrooms and Pressmen. Later on, he moved to Kampala, Uganda to perform with the popular Simba Ngoma band. In Kampala he earned enough money to record his first album. He went back to Nairobi where his album, titled Ladies Choice, was produced by Maurice Oyando, father of RV and radio host Tallia Oyando, of the Next Level studios. It was released in June 1999. His second album, Cinderella was released in 2001, again by Next Level studios.

His third album, Return of the King, was released in 2004. However, Mighty King Kong publicly blamed its contract of being exploitative. In 2007, he released a compilation album "The Best of King Kong".

Outside Kenya, he performed in Germany, Netherlands and South Africa.

Above all, he was a die-hard supporter of Raila Odinga's ODM political movement which had promised to nominate him to the next parliament to represent the disabled persons of Kenya. He was seen dressed in orange colours as a sign of firm commitment to the party in his last days.

Discography 
Album "The Best of the Mighty King Kong"

 R U ready?
 Cinderella Mama
 Right Direction
 African Leaders
 Give Me Your Love
 Man and Woman
 Stop Violence
 Wan Wadhi
 Life
 Ladies’ Choice
 Mo’ Rounds
 Oringo
 Celebration
 Cassanova Gal
 African Story

Death
He died on Christmas Day, 2007 at the age of 34, after being poisoned (as attributed in the local newspapers). He was transported to Kenyatta National Hospital in Nairobi, where he died as he was being treated. He was survived by his widow, Jackline Ouma, and a child.

References

External links 

1973 births
2007 deaths
Deaths by poisoning
Kenyan musicians
People from Siaya County